Kai Herdling (born 27 June 1984) is a German former professional footballer who played as a striker  mostly for TSG 1899 Hoffenheim.

Career 
Born in Heidelberg, Herdling began his career with SG Heidelberg-Kirchheim and moved later to SpVgg Neckarsteinach in the youth ranks. At the beginning of the 2002–03 season, he joined TSG 1899 Hoffenheim in the Regionalliga Süd.

In the third round of the 2003–04 DFB-Pokal, Herdling scored the winning goal for Hoffenheim against Bundesliga side Bayer Leverkusen, which ended 3–2.

He left the club before the 2008–09 season to join Regionalliga team Waldhof Mannheim. After the first half of the 2008–09 season, Herdling returned to Hoffenheim on 26 January 2009.

His first 2. Bundesliga match was against FC Augsburg, on 28 March 2008. He scored his first second division goal in a 2–1 loss against Alemannia Aachen, on 13 April 2008.

He made his Bundesliga debut against Mainz 05, on 7 March 2010, but otherwise stayed with Hoffenheim's reserve team.

On 16 April 2012, Herdling was loaned out to the Philadelphia Union of Major League Soccer, and played for two months. In his time in America, he played in four league matches (starting three) and two Lamar Hunt U.S. Open Cup ties.

After he had scored twice in Hoffenheim's 9–0 DFB-Pokal first round win against SG Aumund-Vegesack, coach Markus Gisdol took him to the first-team squad for the 2013–14 season.

In May 2016, he ended his career without having made a single appearance in the 2015–16 season due to a chronic knee injury.

Career statistics

References

External links 
 

1984 births
Living people
Sportspeople from Heidelberg
Footballers from Baden-Württemberg
German footballers
Association football forwards
Bundesliga players
2. Bundesliga players
Regionalliga players
Oberliga (football) players
Major League Soccer players
TSG 1899 Hoffenheim players
TSG 1899 Hoffenheim II players
SV Waldhof Mannheim players
Philadelphia Union players
German football managers
Bundesliga managers
TSG 1899 Hoffenheim managers
German expatriate footballers
German expatriate sportspeople in the United States
Expatriate soccer players in the United States